The Croatian Parliament electoral districts are the special territorial subdivision of Croatia used for the country's parliamentary elections.

Croatia has twelve electoral districts. Ten of these are geographical districts within Croatia, each providing fourteen members of Croatian Parliament. District XI is for Croatian citizens living abroad, with three members of parliament (until 2011, it elected a maximum twelve members of parliament, depending on turnout). District XII is for national minorities, providing eight members of parliament.

The first ten districts are roughly based on geography, but shaped according to the number of voters so that each district holds roughly the same amount of registered voters, around 400,000. These districts therefore do not correspond to the borders of top administrative divisions within Croatia and each district contains one or more or parts of several Croatian counties.

History

These districts have been in place since the Law on Electoral Districts of 1999.

They have been used in the following elections : 2000, 2003, 2007, 2011, 2015, 2016, 2020.

In December 2010, the Constitutional Court of Croatia ruled that an update to the layout of electoral districts was necessary, as the differences in the number of voters among the districts, limited by law to 5%, had grown to 25%.

The first proposal to amend the election law was proposed by Dragutin Lesar, from the Croatian Labourists – Labour Party, in 2011. The new law proposed a division into six geographical constituencies with fixed borders based on county borders, and the number of seats would depend on the number of voters in each. In the first elections, the units would have between 20 and 25 seats. The law also proposed retaining units for the diaspora and national minorities. The proposal was eventually withdrawn due to lack of support.

The second proposal followed in 2014, when the Croatian Labourists – Labour Party proposed constructively the same law with updated mandate numbers, according to which the units had between 20 and 26 mandates. The proposal passed the first vote but fell in the form of a final bill.

The third proposal was discussed at the same time as the second, and was proposed by the Istrian Democratic Assembly. These changes were accompanied by previous laws according to which the boundaries of constituencies should be adjusted to the number of voters, which would reduce the difference in number of voters below 2%. The proposal passed the first vote, but no final debate was held so it was not adopted.

The fourth proposal for changes to the law came from the referendum initiative "People Decide" ("Narod odlučuje"), which in 2018 collected signatures for calling a referendum. The initiative advocated reducing the number of deputies to 100 to 120, with each constituency electing at least 15 deputies, and reducing the number of constituencies whose borders would coincide with those of counties in the future. The Ministry of Administration found that the initiative did not collect enough signatures, which is why a referendum did not follow.

The fifth proposal came from the Social Democratic Party of Croatia, which, along with the amendment of the Law on Electoral Units, also proposes the amendment of the Law on the Election of Members of the Croatian Parliament. The changes envisage six constituencies with the number of mandates depending on the population in each of them, and the current change would be from 18 to 29 representatives.

On February 7, 2023, the Constitutional Court issued a decision repealing the Law on Electoral Units, which expires on October 1, 2023. This required Parliament to pass a new law that would meet legal standards.

Difference between districts

The difference represents the total difference between the largest and smallest district during each election. The legal difference is not above 5%.

Electoral districts 
Area of districts are written in Act on Electoral Districts for the Election of Representatives to the House of Representatives of the Croatian National Parliament published in official gazette on 29 October 1999.

Electoral district I 
Electoral district I consist of:
 northwestern part of Zagreb County including cities and municipalities: Bistra, Brdovec, Dubravica, Jakovlje, Luka, Marija Gorica, Pušča, Zaprešić
 part of central and western City of Zagreb including city districts and streets: Voćarska, Petrova, Ribnjak, Hrvatskih narodnih vladara, Antona Bauera, Matko Laginja, Pavao Šubić, Kralj Zvonimir, Petar Krešimir IV., Knez Mislav, Eugen Kvaternik, Maksimirska naselja, Ružmarinka, Peščenica, Šestine, Mlinovi, Gračani, Markuševec, Vidovec, Remete, Bukovec, Kozjak, Maksimir, Dobri Dol, Dinko Šimunović, Mašićeva, Dotršćina, Ban Keglević, Petar Zrinski, Stjepan Radić, Kraljevac, Ivan Kukuljević Sakcinski, Tuškanac, Gornji Grad, Nova Ves, August Cesarec, Zrinjevac, Cvjetni trg, Andrija Medulić, Ante Topić Mimara, Petar Svačić, August Šenoa, Gupčeva Zvijezda, Medveščak, Šalata, Samoborček, Podsused, Gornji Stenjevec, Perjavica-Borčec, Gornje Vrapče, Vrapče-centar, Vrapče-jug, Gornja Kustošija, Kustošija-centar, Sveti Duh, Medvedgrad, Šestinski Dol, Jelenovac, Matija Gubec, Rudeš, Ante Starčević, Ljubljanica, Ciglenica, Pongračevo, Nikola Tesla, Stara Trešnjevka, S.S. Kranjčević, Antun Mihanović, Bartol Kašić, Horvati-Srednjaci, Knežija, Trnjanska Savica, Martinovka, Poljane, Miramare, Cvjetnica, Marin Držić, Trnje, Cvjetno naselje, Veslačko naselje, Savski kuti, Staro Trnje, Hrvatskog književnika Mile Budaka, Sigečica

Electoral district II 
Electoral district II consist of:
 eastern part of Zagreb County including cities and municipalities: Bedenica, Brckovljani, Dubrava, Dugo Selo, Farkaševac, Gradec, Preseka, Rakovec, Sveti Ivan Zelina, Vrbovec
 whole Koprivnica-Križevci County
 whole Bjelovar-Bilogora County
 eastern part of City of Zagreb including city districts and streets: Adamovec, Belovar, Blaguša, Budenec, Cerje-Sesvete, Dobrodol, Drenčec, Dubec, Dumovec, Đurđekovec, Gajec, Gajišće, Glavnica Donja, Glavnica Gornja, Glavničica, Goranec, Jelkovec, Jesenovec, Kašina, Kašinska Sopnica, Kobiljak, Kučilovina, Kućanec, Luka Sesvete, Lužan, Markovo Polje, Moravče, Novo Brestje, Paruževina, Planina Donja, Planina Gornja, Popovec, Prekvršje, Prepuštovec, Sesvete-Centar, Sesvetska Sela, Sesvetska Selnica, Sesvetska Sopnica, Soblinec, Staro Brestje, Šašinovec, Šija Vrh, Šimunčevec, Vuger Selo, Vugrovec Donji, Vugrovec Gornji, Vurnovec, Žerjavinec and settlements in Dubrava: Trnovčica, Studentski Grad and Poljanice; Granešina, Dankovec, Miroševac, Oporovec, Granešinski Novaki, Zeleni Brijeg, Čulinec, Stari Retkovec, Klaka, Dubrava-središte, Gornja Dubrava, Ivan Mažuranić, Novi Retkovec, Donja Dubrava, 30. svibnja 1990., Čučerje, Branovec-Jalšovec, Novoselec

Electoral district III 
Electoral district III consist of:
 whole Krapina-Zagorje County
 whole Varaždin County
 whole Međimurje County

Electoral district IV 
Electoral district IV consist of:
 whole Virovitica-Podravina County
 whole Osijek-Baranja County

Electoral district V 
Electoral district V consist of:
 whole Požega-Slavonia County
 whole Brod-Posavina County
 whole Vukovar-Syrmia County

Electoral district VI 
Electoral district VI consist of:
 southeastern part of Zagreb County including cities and municipalities: Ivanić Grad, Kloštar Ivanić, Kravarsko, Križ, Orle, Pokupsko, Rugvica, Velika Gorica
 whole Sisak-Moslavina County
 southeastern part of City of Zagreb including city districts and streets: Volovčica, Folnegovićevo naselje, Donje Svetice, Bruno Bušić, Borongaj-Lugovi, Vukomerec, Ferenščica, Savica-Šanci, Žitnjak, Kozari Bok, Resnik, Kozari Putovi, Petruševac, Ivanja Reka, Trnava, Resnički Gaj, Kanal, Zapruđe, Utrine, Travno, Sopot, Siget, Sloboština, Dugave, Središće

Electoral district VII 
Electoral district VII consist of:
 southwestern part of Zagreb County including cities and municipalities: Jastrebarsko, Klinča Sela, Krašić, Pisarovina, Samobor, Stupnik, Sveta Nedjelja, Žumberak
 whole Karlovac County
 eastern part of Primorje-Gorski Kotar County including cities and municipalities: Bakar, Brod Moravice, Čabar, Čavle, Delnice, Fužine, Jelenje, Kastav, Klana, Lokve, Mrkopalj, Novi Vinodolski, Ravna Gora, Skrad, Vinodolska općina, Viškovo, Vrbovsko
 western, southwestern and southern part of City of Zagreb including city districts and streets: Gajnice, Stenjevec, Malešnica, Špansko, Prečko, Vrbani, Jarun, Gajevo, Trnsko-Krešimir Rakić, Kajzerica, Savski Gaj, Remetinec, Blato, Jakuševac, Hrelić, Sveta Klara, Botinec, Brebernica, Brezovica, Buzin, Demerje, Desprim, Donji Čehi, Donji Dragonožec, Donji Trpuci, Drežnik Brezovički, Goli Breg, Gornji Čehi, Gornji Dragonožec, Gornji Trpuci, Grančari, Havidić Selo, Horvati, Hrašće Turopoljsko, Hrvatski Leskovac, Hudi Bitek, Ježdovec, Kupinečki Kraljevec, Lipnica, Lučko, Mala Mlaka, Odra, Odranski Obrež, Starjak, Strmec, Veliko Polje, Zadvorsko

Electoral district VIII 
Electoral district VIII consist of:
 whole Istria County
 western part of Primorje-Gorski Kotar County including cities and municipalities: Baška, Cres, Crikvenica, Dobrinj, Kostrena, Kraljevica, Krk, Lovran, Mali Lošinj, Malinska - Dubašnica, Matulji, Mošćenička Draga, Omišalj, Opatija, Punat, Rab, Rijeka, Vrbnik

Electoral district IX 
Electoral district IX consist of:
 whole Lika-Senj County
 whole Zadar County
 whole Šibenik-Knin County
 northern part of Split-Dalmatia County including cities and municipalities: Dicmo, Dugopolje, Hrvace, Kaštela, Klis, Lećevica, Marina, Muć, Okrug, Otok, Prgomet, Primorski Dolac, Seget, Sinj, Trilj, Trogir, Vrlika

Electoral district X 
Electoral district X consist of:
 southern part of Split-Dalmatia County including cities and municipalities: Baška Voda, Bol, Brela, Cista Provo, Dugi Rat, Gradac, Hvar, Imotski, Jelsa, Komiža, Lokvičići, Lovreč, Makarska, Milna, Nerežišća, Omiš, Podbablje, Podgora, Podstrana, Postira, Proložac, Pučišća, Runovići, Selca, Solin, Split, Stari Grad, Sućuraj, Supetar, Sutivan, Šestanovac, Šolta, Tučepi, Vis, Vrgorac, Zadvarje, Zagvozd, Zmijavci
 whole Dubrovnik-Neretva County

Electoral district XI 
Special electoral district for election representatives by Croatian citizens who do not reside in Croatia.

Electoral district XII 
Electoral district for national minorities in Croatia elects their representatives with the district covering all of Croatia.

References 

Elections in Croatia
Politics of Croatia
Electoral districts in Croatia
Croatia politics-related lists